The 1999–2000 Tunisian Ligue Professionnelle 1 season was the 74th season of top-tier football in Tunisia.

Results

League table

Result table

Leaders

References
1999–2000 Ligue 1 on RSSSF.com

Tunisian Ligue Professionnelle 1 seasons
Tun